Rouyn-Noranda (2021 population 42,313) is a city on Osisko Lake in the Abitibi-Témiscamingue region of Quebec, Canada.

The city of Rouyn-Noranda is  a coextensive with a territory equivalent to a regional county municipality (TE) and census division (CD) of Quebec of the same name. Their geographical code is 86.

History

The city of Rouyn (named for Jean-Baptiste Rouyn, a captain in the Régiment Royal Roussillon of Louis-Joseph de Montcalm) appeared after copper was discovered in 1917. Noranda (a contraction of "North Canada") was created later around the Horne mine and foundry. Both were officially constituted as cities in 1926, then merged in 1986.

Since 1966, Rouyn and Noranda constitute the capital of the Abitibi-Témiscamingue region. It is also the seat of Université du Québec en Abitibi-Témiscamingue (UQAT) since 1983.

The population tends to increase or decrease dramatically depending on the economic situation. The city's population dropped by 5 per cent between the 1996 and 2001 census, before increasing slightly by 0.8 per cent for the 2006 census. This more closely parallels the demographic patterns of Northern Ontario than those of Quebec during this period. Rouyn-Noranda also has other cultural affiliations with Northern Ontario, being the only municipality in Quebec that holds a membership in the Francophone Association of Municipalities of Ontario.

The Roman Catholic Diocese of Rouyn-Noranda was established on February 9, 1974, by Pope Paul VI, with Mgr. Jean-Guy Hamelin as its first bishop.  It is part of the Metropolitan Province of Gatineau. Mgr. Dorylas Moreau was appointed as bishop on November 30, 2001, replacing Mgr. Hamelin. On September 15, 2003, a decree moved the cathedral from Saint-Michel-Archange Church to Saint-Joseph Church.

Communities

As part of the 2000–2006 municipal reorganization in Quebec, on January 1, 2002 the municipalities (including unorganized territories) of the former Rouyn-Noranda Regional County Municipality amalgamated into the new City of Rouyn-Noranda.  These were: 
Arntfield, Bellecombe, Beaudry, Cadillac, Cléricy, Cloutier, D'Alembert, Destor, Évain, Lac-Montanier, Lac-Surimau, McWatters, Mont-Brun, Montbeillard, Rapides-des-Cèdres, Rollet, and the former Rouyn-Noranda.

Demographics 

The city has around 96% French speakers.

Politics
Federally, Rouyn-Noranda is part of the Abitibi—Témiscamingue riding. The MP is  Sébastien Lemire of the Bloc Québécois.

Provincially, Rouyn-Noranda is part of the Rouyn-Noranda–Témiscamingue riding. The MNA is Émilise Lessard-Therrien of Québec solidaire.

The city's mayor is Diane Dallaire.

Rouyn-Noranda is also a territory equivalent to a regional county municipality (TE) and census division (CD) of Quebec, coextensive with the city of Rouyn-Noranda. Its geographical code is 86.

Rouyn-Noranda is the seat of the judicial district of the same name.

Sports

The Rouyn-Noranda Huskies have played in the Quebec Major Junior Hockey League since the Saint-Hyacinthe Laser relocated to the town in 1996. Rouyn-Noranda has produced a large number of NHLers for its size including former NHL stars Pierre Turgeon, Stephane Matteau, Sylvain Turgeon, Dale Tallon, Pit Martin, Jacques Laperrière, Jacques Cloutier, Dave Keon and Kent Douglas, the last two both members of the 1967 Stanley Cup Champion Toronto Maple Leafs. Former NHL players Réjean Houle, Éric Desjardins and the Bordeleau Brothers (Christian, Jean Paul and Paulin) also hail from the city. Rouyn-Noranda native Marc-André Cliche played in his first NHL game in 2010. Their most fierce rivals are the Val-d'Or Foreurs, which constitute the "Battle of the 117" since both cities are connected by Route 117.

Economy
The unemployment rate of the region was 6.6% in 2016.

Propair has its headquarters on the property of Rouyn-Noranda Airport.

Glencore Copper Canada currently operates the Horne smelter. The smelter is the world's largest processor of electronic scrap containing copper and precious metals. It opened in 1927 at the site of the Horne copper mine. The mine was closed in 1976, but the smelter remained in production.

Université du Québec en Abitibi-Témiscamingue is based in Rouyn-Noranda, with campuses elsewhere.

Culture

Since 1982, the city has been host to the International Cinema Festival of Abitibi-Témiscamingue and since 2003, the host of the Emerging Music Festival in Abitibi-Témiscamingue.

Notable cultural figures from Rouyn-Noranda include singer-songwriter Richard Desjardins, actors Paule Baillargeon, Anne Dorval and Bruce Greenwood, and science fiction writer Éric Gauthier.

Rouyn-Noranda is known as "La Capitale Nationale du Cuivre" (or the National Copper Capital) for its extensive copper deposits and mining/smelting activities.

Transportation
The city is served by the Rouyn-Noranda Airport and has a small public transit system of four bus routes serving the urban area.

The primary highways through the city are the north–south Route 101 and the east–west Route 117, which is part of the Trans-Canada Highway system.

Media

Almost all media in Rouyn-Noranda and the nearby city of Val-d'Or serves both cities. Although the cities are far enough apart that radio and television stations in the area serve the cities from separate transmitters, almost every broadcast station in either city has a rebroadcaster in the other city. The only nominal exceptions are the cities' separate NRJ stations, although at present even these stations share the majority of their broadcast schedule.

Attractions
St. George Russian Orthodox Church of Rouyn is a Russian Orthodox Church, with traditional architecture. It was erected between 1955 and 1957 by the Russian community, at the time about twenty families. A guided tour explains the celebration of Mass and the history of immigrant communities and their role in local history. This distinctive church paints a vivid picture of the lives of the people who suffered through the First and Second World Wars and finally came to live in Canada.

See also

 List of regional county municipalities and equivalent territories in Quebec
 :Category:People from Rouyn-Noranda
 :Category:Sportspeople from Rouyn-Noranda

References and notes

Sources
Gourd, Benoit-Beaudry. "Rouyn-Noranda", in The Canadian Encyclopedia, Volume 3. Edmonton: Hurtig Publishing, 1988.

Further reading
 Rodrigue, Patrick. "Rouyn-Noranda, la Mecque du rock 'n' roll" & "Un Musée du rock 'n' roll pourrait naître à Rouyn-Noranda", Abitibi-Express, vol. 1, no 44 (31 mai 2011), p. 4. N.B.: Paired ill. articles, each individually titled and separately accessible also on the newspaper's Internet site, describing Rouyn-Noranda as one of the two contrasting poles, the other being Montréal, of popular music in Québec.

External links

Ville de Rouyn-Noranda 

 
Cities and towns in Quebec
Territories equivalent to a regional county municipality